Bride of the Sea may refer to:

Cities
 Rio Grande, Rio Grande do Sul, Brazil
 Jaffa, Tel Aviv, Israel
 Venice, Italy
 Tripoli, Libya
 Alexandria, Egypt

Other
 The Bride of the Sea, a 1913 film with Jeanne Eagels
 The Bride of the Sea, a 1965 film directed by Arman
 "The Bride of the Sea", a poem by H. P. Lovecraft
 Bride of the Sea (Невеста моря), a 1994 book by Rafael Grugman
 Bride of the Sea (De Bruid der Zee), a 1901 opera by Jan Blockx
 Bride of the Sea, a British ship shipwrecked in the Bosphorus in 1856